Popovkino is a rural locality (a village) in Samotovinskoye Rural Settlement, Velikoustyugsky District, Vologda Oblast, Russia. The population was 45 as of 2002.

Geography 
Popovkino is located 5 km northwest of Veliky Ustyug (the district's administrative centre) by road. Onbovo is the nearest rural locality.

References 

Rural localities in Velikoustyugsky District